Patrick David Gallagher (born March 29, 1963) is an American physicist and the eighteenth chancellor of the University of Pittsburgh. He was formerly the 14th director of the U.S. Department of Commerce's National Institute of Standards and Technology (NIST) and had served as the Acting United States Deputy Secretary of Commerce. On February 8, 2014, he was named the Chancellor-elect of the University of Pittsburgh and assumed the position of Chancellor on August 1, 2014. He announced on April 7, 2022, that he will step down from the chancellor's job in the summer of 2023 and join the department of physics and astronomy at the university.

Biography

Gallagher was born and raised in Albuquerque to Claire A. Gallagher (née Selter; born in Sunbury, PA to Agnes J. Selter (née Karb) and Adolf P. Selter) and John Gallagher (born in Ireland, having moved to Philadelphia at the age of 2). His father, worked at Sandia National Laboratories. During high school, the young Gallagher spent summers working on public health and sanitation projects in Mexico, Ecuador, and Honduras under sponsorship of Amigos de las Américas. He graduated from St. Pius High School.
 
Gallagher studied Physics and Philosophy at Benedictine College in Atchison, Kansas. After graduating in 1985, he taught math and science for a year at Bishop LeBlond High School in St. Joseph, Missouri, where he also served as head coach for the cross-country track team. Returning to graduate school, he received his Ph.D. in physics at the University of Pittsburgh in 1991, and did post-doctoral research at Boston University. He joined the NIST Center for Neutron Research as an instrumental scientist in 1993. His research interests have included neutron and X-ray instrumentation and studies of soft condensed matter systems such as liquids, polymers, and gels.

In 2000, Gallagher was selected as NIST agency representative at the National Science and Technology Council (NSTC). Then, starting in 2004, he served for four years as Director of the NIST Center for Neutron Research (NCNR), a national user facility for neutron scattering on the NIST Gaithersburg campus. In 2008, he became deputy director of NIST.

Nominated by President Obama, Gallagher was confirmed as the 14th Director of NIST on November 5, 2009. He also served as Under Secretary of Commerce for Standards and Technology, a new position created in the America COMPETES Reauthorization Act of 2010, signed by President Obama on January 4, 2011.

Gallagher has been active in the area of U.S. policy for scientific user facilities and was chair of the Interagency Working Group on neutron and light source facilities under the Office of Science and Technology Policy. Currently, he serves as co-chair of the Standards Subcommittee under the White House National Science and Technology Council.

Gallagher and his wife, Karen Jane (Abrahamson) Gallagher, an occupational therapist, have three sons, Sean, Devin, and Ryan.

References

External links
 University of Pittsburgh Chancellor's Office, official page
 

1963 births
American people of Irish descent
People from Albuquerque, New Mexico
21st-century American physicists
Living people
Benedictine College alumni
University of Pittsburgh alumni
Chancellors of the University of Pittsburgh
Under Secretaries of Commerce for Standards and Technology